French-Canadian Americans (also referred to as Franco-Canadian Americans or Canadien Americans) are Americans of French-Canadian descent. About 2.1 million U.S. residents cited this ancestry in the 2010 U.S. Census; the majority of them speak French at home. 
Americans of French-Canadian descent are most heavily concentrated in New England, New York State, Louisiana and the Midwest. Their ancestors mostly arrived in the United States from Quebec between 1840 and 1930, though some families became established as early as the 17th and 18th centuries.

The term Canadien (French for "Canadian") may be used either in reference to nationality or ethnicity in regard to this population group. French-Canadian Americans, because of their proximity to Canada and Quebec, kept their language, culture, and religion alive much longer than any other ethnic group in the United States apart from Mexican Americans. Many "Little Canada" neighborhoods developed in New England cities, but gradually disappeared as their residents eventually assimilated into the American mainstream.  A revival of the Canadian identity has taken place in the Midwestern states, where some families of French descent have lived for many generations. These states had been considered part of Canada until 1783.  A return to their roots seems to be taking place, with a greater interest in all things that are Canadian or Québécois.

French-Canadian population in New England 
In the late 19th century, many Francophones arrived in New England from Quebec and New Brunswick to work in textile mill cities in New England.  In the same period, Francophones from Quebec soon became a majority of the workers in the saw mill and logging camps in the Adirondack Mountains and their foothills. Others sought opportunities for farming and other trades such as blacksmiths in Upstate New York.  By the mid-20th century French-Canadian Americans comprised 30 percent of Maine's population.  Some migrants became lumberjacks but most concentrated in industrialized areas and into enclaves known as Little Canadas in cities like Lewiston, Maine, Holyoke, Massachusetts, and Woonsocket, Rhode Island.

Driven by depleted farmlands, poverty and a lack of local economic opportunitunities, rural inhabitants of these areas sought work in the expanding mill industries.  Newspapers in New England carried advertisements touting the desirability of wage labor work in the textile mills.  In addition to industry's organized recruitment campaigns, the close kinship network of French-Canadians facilitated transnational communication and the awareness of economic opportunity for their friends and relatives. Individual French-Canadian families who desired dwellings developed French Canadian neighborhoods, called Petit Canadas, and sought out local financing. Most arrived through railroads such as the Grand Trunk Railroad.

French-Canadian women saw New England as a place of opportunity and possibility where they could create economic alternatives for themselves distinct from the expectations of their farm families in Canada.  By the early 20th century some saw temporary migration to the United States to work as a rite of passage and a time of self-discovery and self-reliance. Most moved permanently to the United States, using the inexpensive railroad system to visit Quebec from time to time. When these women did marry, they had fewer children with longer intervals between children than their Canadian counterparts. Some women never married, and oral accounts suggest that self-reliance and economic independence were important reasons for choosing work over marriage and motherhood. These women conformed to traditional gender ideals in order to retain their 'Canadienne' cultural identity, but they also redefined these roles in ways that provided them increased independence in their roles as wives and mothers.

The French-Canadians became active in the Catholic Church where they tried with little success to challenge its domination by Irish clerics. They founded such newspapers as 'Le Messager' and 'La Justice.' The first hospital in Lewiston, Maine, became a reality in 1889 when the Sisters of Charity of Montreal, the "Grey Nuns", opened the doors of the Asylum of Our Lady of Lourdes. This hospital was central to the Grey Nuns' mission of providing social services for Lewiston's predominately French-Canadian mill workers. The Grey Nuns struggled to establish their institution despite meager financial resources, language barriers, and opposition from the established medical community. Immigration dwindled with the U.S. immigration restrictions after World War I.

The French-Canadian community in New England tried to preserve some of its cultural norms. This doctrine, like efforts to preserve Francophone culture in Quebec, became known as la Survivance.

Cities

States

French Canadian immigration to New England

American cities founded by or named after French Canadians

Biloxi, founded by  Pierre LeMoyne d'Iberville
Bourbonnais named after François Bourbonnais
Davenport, Iowa founded by Antoine LeClaire
Detroit, Michigan, named by French explorer Antoine de la Mothe Cadillac*
Dubuque, named after Julien Dubuque
Huron, founded by Jean-Baptiste Flemmond
Juneau, named after Joe Juneau
La Barge, Wyoming, named after Joseph Marie La Barge
Laramie, Wyoming, named after Jacques La Remee
Milwaukee, founded by Solomon Juneau 
Mobile, founded by Pierre LeMoyne d'Iberville
New Orleans, founded by Lemoyne de Bienville
Portage Des Sioux founded by Zenon Trudeau and François Saucier.
Provo, Utah, named for Etienne Provost
Saint Joseph, founded by Joseph Robidoux
Saint Paul, first settled by Pierre Parrant
Vincennes founded by François-Marie Bissot

Notable French Canadian Americans

 John C. Frémont, first Republican nominee for President of the United States, former United States senator from California, former Military Governor of California, former Governor of the Arizona Territory
 Alex Trebek, former host of Jeopardy!

See also

 History of the Franco-Americans

References

Further reading

 Anctil, Pierre. (1979). A Franco-American Bibliography: New England, Bedford, N. H.: National Materials Development Center, 137 p.
 Barkan, Elliott Robert. (1980) "French Canadians". in Stephan Thernstrom, ed. Harvard Encyclopedia of American Ethnic Groups 388-401, comprehensive survey
 Brault, Gérard-J. (1986). The French-Canadian Heritage in New England, Hanover: University Press of New England, 1986, 282 p.  (online excerpt)
 Brown, Michael. "Franco-American Identity at the University of Maine," Maine History 1997 36(3-4): 106-119
 Chartier, Armand, and Claire Quintal (1999). The Franco-Americans of New England. A History, Manchester and Worcester: ACA Assurance and Institut français of Assumption College, 537 p. . 537pp; encyclopedic coverage, 1860 to 1990s.
 Doty, C. Stewart. "The Future of the Franco-American Past," American Review of Canadian Studies, Spring 2000, Vol. 30 Issue 1, pp 7–17 calls for further research on trade unionism, politics, farming and logging, links with Quebec elites, and literary figures.
 
 Fedunkiw, Marianne P. "French-Canadian Americans." in Gale Encyclopedia of Multicultural America, edited by Thomas Riggs, (3rd ed., vol. 2, Gale, 2014), pp. 167–183. Online
 Fréchette, Louis (1900). The United States for French Canadians, 345 pages online free
 Gagné, Peter J. and Adrien Gabriel Morice (2000). French-Canadians of the West. A Biographical Dictionary of French-Canadians and French Métis of the Western United States and Canada, Quintin Publications, 
 Geyh, Patricia Keeney, et al. (2002). French Canadian Sources. A Guide for Genealogists, Ancestry Publishing, 320 pages  (online excerpt)
 Gosnell, Jonathan. "Le base ball, Assimilation, and Ethnic Identity: The National Pastime in Franco-America." Quebec Studies 66 (2018): 49-75. online
 
 
 
 Lamarre, Jean. (2003). The French Canadians of Michigan, Wayne State University Press, 209 pages  (online excerpt)
 Laflamme, J.L.K., David E. Lavigne and J. Arthur Favreau. (1908) 
 Louder, Dean R., and Eric Waddell, eds. (1993). French America. Mobility, Identity, and Minority Experience Across the Continent, Louisiana State University Press, 371 pages 
 Lindenfeld, Jacqueline. (2002). The French in the United States. An Ethnographic Study, Greenwood Publishing Group, 184 pages  (online excerpt)
 Monnier, Alain. "Franco-Americains et Francophones aux Etats-Unis" ("Franco-Americans and French Speakers in the United States). Population 1987 42(3): 527-542. Census study.
 Murphy, Lucy Eldersveld, Great Lakes Creoles: A French-Indian Community on the Northern Borderlands, Prairie du Chien, 1750-1860. New York: Cambridge University Press, 2014.
 Perreault, Robert B. Franco-American Life and Culture in Manchester, New Hampshire: Vivre La Difference (2010) excerpt and text search
 Potvin, Raymond H. "The Franco-American Parishes of New England: Past, Present and Future," American Catholic Studies 2003 114(2): 55-67.
 Richard, Mark Paul. (2008) Loyal but French: The Negotiation of Identity by French-Canadian Descendants in the United States, on acculturation in Lewiston, Maine, 1860 to the 2000
 Richard, Mark Paul. (2016) "'Sunk into Poverty and Despair': Franco-American Clergy Letters to FDR during the Great Depression." Quebec Studies 61#1: 39-52. online
 Richard, Sacha. (2002) "American Perspectives on 'La Fievre aux Etats-Unis,' 1860–1930: A Historiographical Analysis of Recent Writings on the Franco-Americans in New England," Canadian Review of American Studies 32(1): 105-132
 Roby, Yves. (2004). The Franco-Americans of New England. Dreams and Realities, Montreal: Les éditions du Septentrion, 543 pages  (online excerpt) translated by Mary Ricard.
 Rumily, Robert. (1958) Histoire des Franco Americains. a standard history, in French
 Stewart, Alice R. (1987) "The Franco-Americans of Maine: A Historiographical Essay," Maine Historical Society Quarterly  26(3): 160-179
  Vermette, David G. (2018) A Distinct Alien Race: The Untold Story of Franco-Americans: Industrialization, Immigration, Religious Strife
 Warren, Jean-Philippe. (2017) "The French Canadian Press in the United States." Journal of Modern Periodical Studies 7.1-2: 74-95. online

Primary sources
 Madore, Nelson, and Barry Rodrigue, eds. Voyages: A Maine Franco-American Reader (2009)
 Robbins, Rhea Cote. 'down the Plains,' (2013) http://www.rhetapress.com/
 Robbins, Rhea Cote. Wednesday's Child (2008)
 Robbins, Rhea Cote, ed. Canuck and Other Stories (2006)

External links
American-French Genealogical Society A genealogical and historical organization for French-Canadian research

 
European-American society
 
 
French American